The Axholme Academy (formerly North Axholme School) is a mixed secondary school located in Crowle, North Lincolnshire, England.

History

Secondary modern school
North Axholme Secondary School opened in November 1957 with 240 children; it was a secondary modern school.
It was officially opened Wednesday 17 September 1958 by Frederick Gough, with 390 children and 17 staff. The school had cost £143,000, being built over fourteen months, and was opened three months early. It was hoped that the other Isle of Axholme secondary school (South Axholme Secondary School) would be ready by September 1960.

At the school prize day, on Tuesday 21 July 1964, prizes were handed out by Simon Barrington-Ward, the Chaplain of Magdalene College, Cambridge, later the Bishop of Coventry from 1985 to 1997. Out in the Isle of Axholme, the grammar school system was broadly supported, and the headmaster Mr L George warned about possible changes to the local selective system, if a parent had a child capable of attending a grammar school. The Scunthorpe education division change to comprehensive schools, had originated only from Labour supporters in Scunthorpe, animated at a perceived possible unfairness of the eleven-plus system; rural secondary schools have weathered the change to comprehensive education much better than secondary schools in Scunthorpe, which have not fared well; and apart from the success and renown of the John Leggott sixth form college, much of the rest of Scunthorpe's enthusiasm for the comprehensive system has frequently backfired. Yet it was Scunthorpe that had mostly provoked this change, and not the Isle of Axholme.

The headmaster Mr L George wanted a wider curriculum, and there would be cooperation with South Axholme Secondary School and North Lindsey Technical College. A pre-nursing course, for girls, had started. From September 1964, Epworth children would travel to Crowle for nursing, and Crowle children would travel to Epworth for commerce and metalwork.

Comprehensive
The school was previously a community school administered by North Lincolnshire Council, North Axholme School was converted to academy status on 1 January 2012 and was renamed The Axholme Academy. However the school continues to coordinate with North Lincolnshire Council for admissions.

Structure
The school is on the west side of the north-south A161, south of Crowle, and towards Ealand, to the south. An electricity transmission line passes east-west, close to the north of the school.

Curriculum
The Axholme Academy offers GCSEs and BTECs as programmes of study for pupils.

References

External links
 The Axholme Academy official website

1957 establishments in England
Academies in the Borough of North Lincolnshire
Educational institutions established in 1957
Secondary schools in the Borough of North Lincolnshire